John Ignatius Kane Sr. (born ) is an American politician and trade union leader. He is a Democratic member of the Pennsylvania State Senate, representing the 9th District since 2021.

Kane trained as a plumber, stating that learning a trade gave his life direction. He later became the Business Manager of the Philadelphia Plumbers Local 690. Kane ran for state senate in 2014, against Thomas J. McGarrigle.

He defeated Brett Burman in the Democratic primary for the 9th district on June 2, 2020. He won the November 2020 general election over incumbent Republican Tom Killion, receiving 52% of the vote compared to Killion's 48%.

References 

1960 births
Living people
21st-century American politicians
Democratic Party Pennsylvania state senators
American plumbers

Politicians from Chester County, Pennsylvania
20th-century American people
Trade unionists from Pennsylvania